Guvvala Balaraj is an Indian politician who is a member of the legislative assembly representing Achampet (SC) (Assembly constituency). He belongs to Telangana Rashtra Samithi and is its official spokesperson.

Early life
He was born in village in Wanaparthy in Mahbubnagar district, Andhra Pradesh to Guvvala Ramulu & Bakkamma, an agricultural laborer. He went to ZPHS in Wanaparthy, graduation from New Government Degree College, Khairtabad and LLM from PRR Law College, Hyderabad.

Career
He started working part-time with his father, who was a laborer and later became a small construction contractor. He now runs a company, GBR Infrastructure in Hyderabad.

Political career

He contested but lost to Manda Jagannath as a Member of Parliament for Nagarkurnool constituency. He won as an MLA from Achampet with nearly 12,000 votes majority in the first Telangana Legislative Elections, 2014.

Personal life
Guvvala Balaraju married Amala.

References

Telangana MLAs 2014–2018
Telangana MLAs 2018–2023
Telangana Rashtra Samithi politicians
1981 births
Living people